The 2014–15 Detroit Waza season was the seventh season of the Detroit Waza professional indoor soccer club, also known as Detroit Waza Flo Pro FC. The Waza, an Eastern Division team in the Major Arena Soccer League, played their home games at the Melvindale Civic Center in the Detroit suburb of Melvindale, Michigan.

The team was led by team owner Mario Scicluna, head coach Costea Decu, and assistant coach Mirco Gubellini. The team struggled to a 4-16 record, placing fourth in the five-team Eastern Division, and did not qualify for post-season play.

Season summary
Detroit opened the season with a home win over the Harrisburg Heat, dropped games to the Rochester Lancers and Baltimore Blast, then defeated Harrisburg on the road. After two more losses, the Waza beat the Syracuse Silver Knights then started an eight-game losing streak, broken only by a third victory over Harrisburg. They closed the season with a roster diminished by trades at the deadline and lost their last four games. With their 4–16 record, Detroit placed fourth in the Eastern Division (ahead of only Harrisburg) and did not qualify for the playoffs.

History
The Waza were a charter member of the Professional Arena Soccer League and the only PASL team to operate continuously from the league's 2008 debut through its 2014 rebranding. The franchise struggled in its first three seasons, posting 7–9, 6–10, and 8–8 records. In 2011–12, the team went 13–3 and won the Eastern Division but lost the Ron Newman Cup Finals. In 2012–13, the Waza improved to 14–2 and again won the Eastern Division only to lose again in the Finals. 2013–14 saw a slip to 10–5, second place in the Eastern Division, and an early exit from the playoffs.

The Waza organization has a long history of community involvement and operates more than 100 youth soccer teams in the Detroit area. The team won the 2012–13 United States Open Cup for Arena Soccer.

Off-field moves
In May 2014, the Professional Arena Soccer League added six teams from the failed third incarnation of the Major Indoor Soccer League and reorganized as the Major Arena Soccer League. The 2014–15 MASL season will be 20 games long, 4 more than the 16 regular season games of recent PASL seasons. With the league expansion and reorganization, the Waza's Eastern division rivals for 2014–15 are the Baltimore Blast, Harrisburg Heat, Rochester Lancers, and Syracuse Silver Knights.

In September 2014, Costea Decu was announced as the team's new head coach. Decu had previously served as co-head coach in the 2012–13 season and, as a player, is a founding member of the Detroit Waza. On October 8, the team announced that retired Italian professional player Mirco Gubellini had signed on as the Waza's assistant coach for the 2014–15 season.

The December 6 game against the Syracuse Silver Knights also features a food drive for the Gleaners Community Food Bank in support of the Downriver communities of Wayne County, Michigan. Fans will receive a discount on admission tickets to the game in exchange for non-perishable food items or cans of food.

Roster moves
The Waza held open tryouts to recruit new players and evaluate returning hopefuls on September 19–20 at High Velocity Sports in Canton Township, Michigan.

On October 10, the Waza announced that team captain Miki Djersilo and veteran forward Worteh Sampson re-signed with the team. On October 20, the team re-signed forwards Nik Djokic and Victor Otieno plus midfielder Michael Grba. In late October, the team signed veteran goalkeeper Vito Lonigro and rookie Matteo Zani who most recently played for AS Roma Futsal of Italy's Serie A league.

In advance of the February 1 league trade deadline, Detroit traded team owner and player Dominic Scicluna to the Las Vegas Legends. Scicluna will also serve as an assistant coach with Las Vegas.

Schedule

Regular season

♠ Game played with multi-point scoring (most goals worth 2 points and select goals worth 3 points).

Awards and honors
In September 2014, Dominic Scicluna was named an inductee into the Michigan Soccer Association Hall of Fame.

Detroit's Daniel Mattos earned honorable mention for the league's all-rookie team for 2014-15.

References

External links
Detroit Waza official website
Detroit Waza at WDIV-TV

Detroit Waza
Detroit Waza
Detroit Waza 2014
Detroit Waza 2014